Aggar may refer to the following :

 Aggar (city), an ancient Roman town and former bishopric in Byzacena, now a Latin Catholic titular see
 Aggar (film), a Bollywood film